Asama may refer to:

 Mount Asama, a volcano in Japan
 Asama shrine, a category of Shinto shrine in Japan
 Asama Onsen, an onsen and former skating rink in Matsumoto, Japan
 Japanese cruiser Asama, a cruiser of the Imperial Japanese Navy
 Asama (train), a train service in Japan
 Azemmour, sometimes known in antiquity as Azama or Asama

People with the surname
, Japanese baseball player
, Japanese baseball player

Japanese-language surnames